The following is an incomplete list of artworks by the French artist Antoine Bourdelle.

Antoine Bourdelle (31 October 1861 – 1 October 1929), born Émile Antoine Bordelles, was an influential and prolific French sculptor, painter, and teacher. His studio became the Musée Bourdelle, an art museum dedicated to his work, located at 18, rue Antoine Bourdelle, in the 15th arrondissement of Paris, France.

In 1905, he mounted an exhibition of his work at the Galerie Hébrard in Paris, showing 38 sculptures, 18 paintings and 21 drawings. The sculptures included La Nonne from 1888 as well as the Head of Apollo and his Great Tragic Mask of Beethoven. Bourdelle's father died in 1906 and in 1909 he left Rodin's studio. The year 1910, saw his Héraklès tue les oiseaux du lac Stymphale of 1909 shown at the Salon and this was a huge success!  A version of this work is held in the Musée d'Orsay. Whilst working as a sculptor he also taught at the Académie de la Grande Chaumière in Montparnasse, his pupils including Alberto Giacometti, Aristide Maillol, René Iché and Germaine Richier. 1910 also saw his divorce from Stéphanie Van Parys and in 1911 Rhodia Bourdelle was born to him and Cléopâtre Sévastos. In 1913 an exhibition of modern art in New York included his Héraklès and Tête d’Apollon, the commission for the monument to Genéral Alvéar in Argentina was formalized and he carried out the sculptures for the Théâtre des Champs-Elysées. He founded and was vice president of the Salon des Tuileries.

Many works by Bourdelle can be seen in the Musée Bourdelle- Buste de Beethoven, Adam, Le bélier rétif, Centaure mourant, La Liberté and Vierge à l'enfant. From 1922 to 1923 he worked on La Vierge à l’offrande and completed the maquette for La France. He also completed La Naissance d’Aphrodite for the Marseille Opera House. In 1925 he exhibited at the Exposition internationale des Arts décoratifs showing Sappho, Le Livre and Masque de Bourdelle in the Pavillon du livre.  1926 finally saw his Alvéar monument inaugurated after 10 years of work and a version of La France was exhibited at the Salon des Tuileries. 1928 saw a retrospective exhibition to celebrate the inauguration of the Brussels Palais des Beaux-Arts and 1929, the year of his death, saw the Monument to Adam Mickiewicz inaugurated. Bourdelle died on the 1 October 1929 at Vésinet whilst a guest of the founder Rudier. In 1931 there was a great retrospective of Bourdelle's work at the Paris Orangerie.  He is buried in Montparnasse cemetery. In 1924 he had been made Commandeur de l'Ordre de la Légion d'honneur.

War memorials

Apart from the war memorials mentioned above Bourdelle also worked on a "Monument aux Députés morts pour La France", a memorial honouring the Deputies who had died in the 1914–18 war. He was keen on placing the memorial in the central niche of the Salle du Roi in the Palais Bourbon, a room dominated by Delacroix' paintings and designed the memorial so as not to clash with these works. The female figure in the statue, said to be based on Isadora Duncan, held a huge short sword and held aloft a round shell of the type carried by Greek hoplites. The piece was called "La Victoir du Droit". Bourdelle completed the maquette, the intention being that the final marble statue would be 3.25m high. The project was not pursued by the French State.

Bourdelle's 1922/23 La Vierge à l'Offrande or Vierge à l'Enfant in grey chauvigny limestone at Niederbruck, although not an actual war memorial, was directly linked to the 1914–18 war. Léon Vogt, a pupil of Bourdelle, owned potash mines in Alsace and in 1914 his mother vowed that if the family property was kept from destruction during the war she would commission a statue to celebrate this. She died during the war but after the war, Léon commissioned Bourdelle to execute a suitable statue. Bourdelle completed various studies and the second study, enlarged to 2.5m, was placed in the crypt at Hartmannswillerkopf. The same study but now 6m high was placed on the slope of the wooded hill above Niederbruck in the Manavaux valley to fulfil Mme Voigt's vow. The work was exhibited in the "Section d'Art Religieux" at the Salon d'Automne" of 1921–22. In Bourdelle's work the baby Jesus is held above her shoulder by the Virgin Mary, His arms are outstretched so his body takes on the form of a Cross. The inscription on the statue also gives thanks for Alsace-Lorraine's return to France after the war.

Images of Bourdelle's war memorials

Busts by Bourdelle
Louis Gillet wrote Here are details of some of these busts, including the acclaimed studies of Beethoven which occupied Bourdelle over a long period of time. Bourdelle often submitted portrait busts to the Salons in the hope of attracting commissions.  The bust "Adam" was submitted to the Salon des Artists Français in 1888 and he had submitted his bust of Armand Saintis in 1884, Delard in 1885, the actor "Marais" in 1886 and "La Marquise Silvia de Mari" and "St Merlatti" in 1887.

Cathedrals and churches

In 1916 Bourdelle also created a small votive depicting St Barbe which is held by the Lyon Musée des Beaux-Arts. Bourdelle was asked to create the votive by the family of his brother-in-law, Dr Couchoud, as protection for their son who was away fighting in the artillery. Originally it was placed in the church of St Julien de l'Herm near Lyon before being transferred to the museum. The piece is in polychromed cement. There are copies of the work located in Stockholm, Rome, Bruxelles and Luxembourg.

Works in Musée d'Orsay

Main works

Images of Mickievicz monument, including bas-reliefs

Main works (continued)

References

External links

List
Sculptures by artist
French sculptors
French male sculptors
Art Deco sculptors